Mighty Earthquake and Hurricane is an album by the American blues musician Willie Dixon, released in 1984.

Production
The album was recorded in California. Dixon is backed by his Chicago All-Stars. Typical of Dixon's writing, the album addresses topical issues such as religious dogma ("Pie in the Sky") and nuclear war ("It Don't Make Sense (You Can't Make Peace"). Dixon called the latter song his favorite of all the ones that he had written.

Critical reception

The Globe and Mail wrote that "the music, with the honky-tonk flourishes of piano player Lafayette Leak, and the solemn wail of harmonica player Billy Branch, is consistently engaging."

AllMusic deemed it a "decent modern album by the prolific legend."

Cover versions
Soon after the album's release, Tina Turner added a cover version of the title track to her live set. "Flamin' Mamie" was covered by Koko Taylor on Queen of the Blues, released in 1985.

Track listing

References

Willie Dixon albums
1984 albums